ICOS was an American biotechnology company.

ICOS may also refer to:
ICOS (gene), a gene which encodes the protein CD278
Integrated Carbon Observation System, a research infrastructure
Integrated cavity output spectroscopy, a type of laser absorption spectrometry
International Council of Onomastic Sciences, an academic organization
The International Council on Security and Development, an international think tank 
Irish Co-operative Organisation Society, a business association

See also
ICO (disambiguation)